North Lees is a hamlet in the Harrogate district of North Yorkshire, England. The village is just south of Lightwater Valley and is served by a bus service four times a day between Ripon and Leyburn.

On the south eastern side of the village is the remains of a medieval moat and possibly the site of a Pele tower. Land towards the south western side was used as a firing range during the First World War. Other medieval (and possibly Roman) earthworks have been destroyed when the A6108 road was widened in the 20th century.

On 5 July 2014, the Tour de France Stage 1 from Leeds to Harrogate passed through the village.

References

External links

Villages in North Yorkshire